Ornontowice  is a village in Mikołów County, Silesian Voivodeship, in southern Poland. It is the seat of the gmina (administrative district) called Gmina Ornontowice.

The village has a population of 5,556.

References

Ornontowice